The Nakajima E4N was a Japanese shipboard reconnaissance aircraft of the 1930s. It was a two-seat, single-engine, equal-span biplane seaplane used primarily by the Imperial Japanese Navy.

Development
The first prototype of the Type 90-2 Reconnaissance Seaplane, or E4N1, flew in 1930. This was fitted with twin floats and had no cowling for the engine. This prototype was rejected.

The type was completely redesigned as the Type 90-2-2 or E4N2, with a single main-float and twin, wing-mounted outriggers and introduced a cowled engine. This entered production for the Navy in 1931.

A landplane version of the Type 90-2-2 was developed as the E4N2-C with a tailwheel undercarriage

Operational history
The E4N2 was employed as a shipboard reconnaissance seaplane launched by catapult.

In 1933, nine E4N2-C airframes were converted to P1 mail planes. Single-seat landplanes with an enclosed cockpit, these were employed on night-mail services between the Japanese Home Islands.

Variants
E4N1
(Navy Type 90-2-1 Reconnaissance Seaplane) twin-float seaplane, Nakajima NZ - two prototypes only.
 E4N2
(Navy Type 90-2-2 Reconnaissance Seaplane) - Nakajima NJ single-float seaplane. 85 built.
 E4N2-C
(Navy Type 90-2-3 Carrier Reconnaissance Aircraft) - Nakajima NJ landplane fitted with arresting gear and fixed-undercarriage. 67 built.
E4N3
(Navy Type 90-2-3 Reconnaissance Seaplane) Nakajima NJ.
Nakajima P-1

Single-seat mailplane.  9 converted from E4N2-C airframes.
Nakajima Giyu-11
One of the two E4N1 seaplanes converted with a cabin for use by Tokyo Koku Yuso Kaisha between Haneda airport, Shimizu and Shimoda.

Specifications (Type 90-2-2)

See also

References

Francillon, Réne J. Japanese Aircraft of the Pacific War. London: Putnam & Company Ltd., 1970 (2nd edition 1979). 
Mikesh, Robert C. and Abe, Shorzoe. Japanese Aircraft 1910-1941. London: Putnam Aeronautical Books, 1990.

External links

E04N, Nakajima
E04N
Biplanes
Single-engined tractor aircraft
Aircraft first flown in 1930